Samuel Adeniyi Adegbenro (born 3 December 1995) is a Nigerian professional footballer who plays as a winger for Chinese Super League club Beijing Guoan.

A fast and skillful player able to operate at both flanks, Adegbenro can play in the center as well; as an attacking midfielder or striker. At Rosenborg he mainly played as a left winger in a 4-3-3 formation.

Club career

Nigeria
Adegbenro was born in Nigeria. He started his career at local team Prime before switching to Kwara United.

Adegbenro got ranked as the club's most valuable player by Kwara United general manager, Alhaji Haruna Maigidasanma, after the first half of the 2014 season.

Viking
After impressing at trials earlier that winter, Adegbenro moved to Norwegian Premier League club Viking alongside fellow Nigerian, Suleiman Abdullahi, signing a four-year contract 5 February 2015.

Adegbenro made his debut for Viking on 6 April 2015 against Mjøndalen; they lost the game, 1–0. Adegbenro scored his first goal in Eliteserien against Molde at home, a match which Viking won by 2–1. Adegbenro, accompanied by Suleiman Abdullahi, made a great impact to the team throughout the 2015 season. Making 24 appearances this season, Adegbenro scored 5 goals and assisted another 5.

He was awarded William Danielsen's memory goblet for his debut season at Viking's annual meeting 15 March 2016.

The 2016 season resulted in 28 appearances, 3 goals and 1 assist.

Rosenborg
On 15 August 2017 Adegbenro moved to Rosenborg for around 15 million NOK, signing a four and a half-year contract. Two days later he scored on his debut after coming off the bench securing Rosenborg a 1–0 away win versus Ajax in the first leg of the 2017–18 UEFA Europa League play-off round. In the second leg a week later, Adegbenro helped Rosenborg reach the 2017–18 UEFA Europa League group stage by scoring twice in a 3–2 win at home, making it 4–2 on aggregate.

IFK Norrköping 
On 13 January 2021, Adegbenro moved to IFK Norrköping. On 1 March 2022, Norrköping announced that the club reached the agreement with an unidentified Chinese club for Adegbenro's transfer and that further details of the transfer would be announced when the transfer window opens in China in mid-March. There was no additional announcement made in mid-March. On 6 April 2022, Fotbollskanalen Europa reported that the new club is Beijing Guoan and Adegbenro is in China in COVID-19 quarantine, while there was no official confirmation for the transfer from IFK Norrköping or Beijing Guoan at that time.

Beijing Guoan 
On 15 April 2022, Adegbenro joined Chinese Super League club Beijing Guoan. On 29 October 2022, Adegbenro scored his first 2 goals for Guoan in a 4-1 win against Guangzhou F.C.

Career statistics
.

Honours

Individual
 Allsvenskan Top goalscorer: 2021
 Allsvenskan Forward of the Year: 2021

References

1995 births
Living people
Nigerian footballers
Association football forwards
Viking FK players
Rosenborg BK players
IFK Norrköping players
Beijing Guoan F.C. players
Eliteserien players
Allsvenskan players
Chinese Super League players
Nigerian expatriate footballers
Expatriate footballers in Norway
Nigerian expatriate sportspeople in Norway
Expatriate footballers in Sweden
Nigerian expatriate sportspeople in Sweden
Expatriate footballers in China
Nigerian expatriate sportspeople in China
Sportspeople from Osogbo